Charlotte Elizabeth Tomlinson (born August 4, 1998) is an English model and makeup artist. She is the founder of the self-tanning company, Tanologist.

Early life
Tomlinson was born and raised in Doncaster, South Yorkshire. Her parents are Johannah "Jay" Poulston and Mark Tomlinson. Her older half-brother is singer Louis Tomlinson. She was raised with Louis and three younger sisters: Félicité (2000–2019), and twins Phoebe and Daisy. Her parents divorced in 2011. Tomlinson has two half-siblings, twins Doris and Ernest (born 2014) from Poulston's relationship with Dan Deakin, whom she later married.

Career
Tomlinson began traveling with her brother Louis on tour with his band One Direction when she was 15 for work experience, learning from the band's stylist and makeup artist Lou Teasdale. She worked as Teasdale's assistant in 2015 during the On the Road Again Tour and for the band's promotional appearances. Tomlinson was credited for starting the viral 2015 rainbow root hair look with Bleach London.

In 2016, she collaborated with and became an ambassador for Nails Inc, to promote the spray-on nail polish Paint Can. She worked as a make-up artist for London Fashion Week, Selena Gomez at events, and Jen Atkin. On 25 October 2016, Tomlinson debuted the collaborative collection with Nails Inc. The party was attended by her brother Louis and his then-girlfriend, actress Danielle Campbell.

She briefly appeared in Louis and Bebe Rexha's 2017 music video for Back To You. That October, Tomlinson released her first book, Rainbow Roots: #MAKEUPBYME. The book features over 40 makeup tutorials.

In 2018, Tomlinson launched Tanologist, a self-tanning product and company.

In June 2019, she released a collaboration collection with fashion brand In the Style. In July, she launched an eyelash collaboration with Huda Beauty. Later in December, Tomlinson announced that she and artist Miles Langford would be releasing her late sister's clothing line, Fizzy, with all proceeds going to the charity Child Bereavement UK.

Tomlinson appeared on the Spring/Summer 2020 cover of Sister Magazine, featuring an interview in which she discussed dealing with grief. She has also been a model in ads for PrettyLittleThing, Lipsy London, Ghost Fragrances and Boux Avenue.

Personal life
Tomlinson gained a following on the internet when her half-brother Louis Tomlinson rose to fame. 
In December 2016, Tomlinson's mother died of leukemia. In March 2019, Tomlinson's younger sister, Félicité, died from an accidental overdose. Tomlinson has since been an advocate for mental health and currently is an ambassador for the bereavement charity, Sue Ryder.

Tomlinson began dating British model and former professional tennis player Lewis Burton in 2020. Their son, Lucky Burton, was born in August 2022.

Bibliography

Filmography

Music videos

References

Living people
1998 births
21st-century English businesswomen
21st-century English businesspeople
British cosmetics businesspeople
British Internet celebrities
British make-up artists
Businesspeople from Yorkshire
English company founders
English female models
English women non-fiction writers
People from Doncaster
21st-century British non-fiction writers
21st-century English women writers